Compulsory heterosexuality often shortened to comphet, is the theory that heterosexuality is assumed and enforced upon people by a patriarchal and heteronormative society. The term was popularized by Adrienne Rich in her 1980 essay titled "Compulsory Heterosexuality and Lesbian Existence". According to Rich's theory, women in every culture are believed to have an innate preference for relationships with men and this leads women to devalue and minimize the importance of their relationships with other women; she suggests that women are socialized to identify with males and to cast their "social, political, and
intellectual allegiances" with them, and are discouraged from identifying with other females.

Concept and terminology
Adrienne Rich argued that heterosexuality is a political institution that supports the patriarchal domination of men over women in society, and feminist literature still functions under a heterosexual paradigm. She believes that feminist authors do not adequately acknowledge that institutions such as marriage are merely socializations that have been internalized and reproduced in society. This institution defines the standards for sexual and romantic relationships and alienates those outside of the standards.

Compulsory heterosexuality is viewed as an institution that acts upon individuals from birth, and thus individuals are assumed to be heterosexual until proven otherwise. Due to this, Sandra Lipsitz Bem argues that sexual minorities have a greater "global identity development" from individuals investigating their experiences and senses of self in contrast to society. Individuals with minority sexual orientations are found to consider their sexual orientation as integral to their relationships with other people and as a foundation for their overall identity.

Factors

Manifestations of male power 
The idea states that male dominance in a patriarchal society is a major factor in enforcing compulsory female heterosexuality; that, in order to serve men's needs, heterosexuality requires men to force women into heterosexual relationships and marriage under a patriarchal society. Kathleen Gough argues that there are eight characteristics of "male power in archaic and contemporary societies", which are:

 Rejecting women's sexuality
 Forcing male sexuality upon women
 Exploiting women's labor
 Controlling or robbing women of their children
 Confining women physically
 Using women as objects for male transactions
 Denying women their creativity
 Denying women from knowledge and cultural attainments

These characteristics combined create a culture in which women are convinced that heterosexuality and heterosexual relationships are inevitable by "control of consciousness", particularly when used in conjunction with lesbian erasure.

Heterosexuality is used to make women dependent on men for their wants and needs. The Radical Lesbians argued that heterosexual orientations can only exist under a society in which male domination exists, and that for self-realization women must uplift each other rather than being complacent in oppression by men. Female heterosexuality may also exist under a guise of seeking access to power through men rather than sexual attraction, as male socialization conflates power and dominance with sexual attraction.

Lesbian erasure 

Rich argues that compulsory heterosexuality keeps women subjugated under the patriarchy by not allowing for non-heterosexual, deviant sexuality to be explored, such as lesbian identities. Rich defines lesbian existence as not only a sexual identity but a lifestyle that consciously defies our patriarchal society. Rich states that this identity is a way to limit men's access to women as a whole. Along with lesbian existence, Rich defines the concept of the lesbian continuum as a way to broaden lesbianism to include female friendship/camaraderie. She explains that with this view, all women would be placed on the lesbian spectrum, and therefore less erasure would exist. She believes that there is a "lesbian continuum" of relationships, regardless of sexual desire within them, and that sexual choice is a necessity for female empowerment under male domination.

There is also an exclusion of lesbian identities as a viable and natural option for women in feminist literature in Rich's time. She believes that feminist literature assumes that women are "innately sexually oriented" for heterosexuality and that lesbian identities are formed out of backlash towards men rather than a valid identity in itself, as well as feminist literature not adequately examining compulsory heterosexuality and whether or not women would choose heterosexuality if the society were not patriarchal.

Lesbian erasure can also be considered a health care issue. As doctors assume that all patients are heterosexual, the answer to the question "Are you sexually active?" is followed by questions about birth control methods and such heterosexual-oriented questions without considering that the sexual orientation of the female patient may not be heterosexual. A health care provider who is unaware of a patient's sexual orientation can lead to missing or improperly treating medical problems in non-heterosexual patients.

It is suggested that women outside of standard relationships, such as lesbian and bisexual women, are best able to see the confines that heterosexuality imposes because they are not as adjusted to the inequality within heterosexual relationships, and that heterosexual women are confined to believing that heterosexuality is the only option.

In media 
Lisa M. Diamond's piece, I'm Straight, but I Kissed a Girl': The Trouble with American Media Representations of Female–Female Sexuality", deconstructs the tropes of lesbian relationships in media, which tend to be inaccurate or offensive. She also brings up the criticisms of stereotypical lesbian characters, stating that audience members tend to want more authenticity within female relationships.

Many lesbian women criticize the depiction of lesbian relationships in all media, from films and literature to porn. It seems that even when these lesbian relationships are shown, they tend to only show stereotypical images. This kind of representation only serves to further the lesbian erasure in our society. Along with these stereotypes, fetishization is common among media depictions of lesbian relationships.

Evolutionary theory 
A major drive for compulsory heterosexuality is that of evolution, tying a sexual orientation's worth with reproduction. Evolutionarily speaking, in order to further the species, offspring must be created, and therefore genes are passed on. This basic understanding of biology is then taken steps further, implicating heterosexuality as the "natural" form and therefore making homosexuality specifically, as well as any minority sexuality, "abnormal". As Seidman puts it, science is "a powerful practical-moral force".

Though evolutionary arguments have implications in minority sexualities, they also directly impact the stereotypes of heterosexual relationships and especially concepts of masculinity. Arguments for men being the hunter are then applied to today's understanding of the male gender being superior. The flip side of this understanding is the influence of this on the female gender, with them being depicted as the weaker sex and their main function being childbearing. These understandings however do not include ideas of morality, which is what is being applied to them.

Religion 
Much of religion invokes a binary model for sexuality; for example, the Bible's inclusion of Adam and Eve as the beginning of humanity. Other examples include specific texts such as this one from Leviticus, "Thou shalt not lie with mankind, as with womankind: it is abomination." Religious institutions throughout history have had strict moral guidelines when it came to marriage and what is deemed acceptable in the eyes of God. This directly translates to compulsory heterosexuality in society through influence of leaders of the church, as well as in devout followers of this belief.

Homosexuals have a difficult time finding acceptance, particularly in the Bible Belt:There's little doubt that discrimination against homosexuals is the last "acceptable" form of discrimination. While most folks have outgrown overt racist and sexist attacks, for many people it's still okay to take shots at homosexuals. They are called names, blamed for society's problems, and often humiliated because of their sexual preference.While a binary model for sexuality might be enforced, "Many of the Puritans in colonial New England believed that all human beings were filled with homosexual as well as heterosexual desire and that the good Christian should direct that desire into procreative sex within marriage." This ideology carries over in modern-day conservative Christianity, and is enforced through the idea that the more welcoming people are to the idea of homosexuality, the more people will give in to their homosexual lusts.

Sexism in the labor force 
Rich argues for compulsory heterosexuality in the workplace, to which end she references Catharine MacKinnon's Sexual Harassment of Working Women: A Case of Sex Discrimination. MacKinnon argues that women occupy low-paying jobs and their sexual marketability is a factor in the workplace. MacKinnon states that "her job depends on her pretending to be not merely heterosexual, but a heterosexual woman in terms of dressing and playing the feminine, deferential role required of 'real' women". Rich argues that the treatment of women in the workplace is a significant influence in society's compulsory heterosexuality. Rich argues that women feel pressure to be heterosexual in the workplace, and that this pressure is also present in society as a whole. As a species will become extinct if no reproduction occurs, and human women must be inseminated to produce offspring, heterosexual relationships are necessary for the survival of the human race, barring artificial insemination. According to Rich, women accept the male sex drive and regard themselves as sexual prey, and this influences compulsory heterosexuality. Furthermore, according to Rich, Barry argues for a "sexual domination perspective", claims that men subject women to what she terms as "sexual abuse" and "terrorism", and that the "sexual domination perspective" causes people to consider this "sexual abuse" and "terrorism" to be natural and inevitable and thus ignore it.

According to Rich, women believe men have a natural need to have sex, and this results in them viewing "abuse" as inevitable. Barry argues that this rationale is romanticized through popular media. Rich claims that this is reinforced through compulsory heterosexuality.

In males 
While the concept of compulsory heterosexuality initially only included women, later revisions of the idea have included discussion on how compulsory heterosexuality necessarily requires both men and women to reinforce the construct; ergo, that compulsory heterosexuality impacts males as well.

Tolman, Spencer, Rosen-Reynoso, and Porche (2003) found that even heterosexual males reported being negatively impacted by compulsory heterosexuality through being groomed to aggressively pursue women and through the interactions that society allows them to have with other males. In another article, entitled "In a Different Position: Conceptualizing Female Adolescent Sexuality Development Within Compulsory Heterosexuality", Tolman uses the term hegemonic masculinity to describe the set of norms and behaviors that dominate the social development of males. Moreover, hegemonic masculinity mirrors Rich's construct of compulsory heterosexuality by pointing out the social intuitions that demand specific behaviors from males; she says, "these norms demand that men deny most emotions, save for anger; be hard at all times and in all ways; engage in objectification of women and sex itself; and participate in the continuum of violence against women".

Compulsory heterosexuality also negatively affects gay and bisexual men by teaching them from a young age that straightness is "normal" and therefore anything that deviates from that is abnormal. Debbie Epstein discusses in her book, Silenced Sexualities in Schools and Universities, how heteronormative standards, as well as compulsory heterosexuality, lead not only to young males feeling forced to appear heterosexual, but can lead to violence against these males if they deviate from expectations against them. Hellen Lenskyj has further suggested in her article "Combating homophobia in sport and physical education" that heterosexuality is enforced in males through imitation and violence against those who deviate. Through these norms, males are taught from a young age that if they do not comply to heterosexual norms and standards they place themselves at risk for social exclusion and physical violence against them.

Intersectionality with other minority identities 
To understand the complexity of compulsory heterosexuality, several scholars have pointed out the importance of the impact of this construct on the differential effects on all populations, including minorities. In "No More Secrets, No More Lies: African American History and Compulsory Heterosexuality", Mattie Udora Richardson discusses the additional complexities faced by Black women in terms of forced compulsory heterosexuality. Udora Richardon points out that, "Any divergences from the social norms of marriage, domesticity, and the nuclear family have brought serious accusations of savagery, pathology, and deviance upon Black people." She argues that, as a group that is already stigmatized in multiple ways, Black women face additional pressures from both the Black and White communities towards heteronormativity. Divergences from heterosexuality place Black women in particular risk of physical harm or social exile.

Author L.H. Stallings and her piece, "SBF seeks Miss Afrekete: Authenticity, erasure, and same-sex desire in the personals"  documents the ways black lesbians often had to pursue other avenues to date or make friends as a result of discrimination in lesbian bars and spaces due to racist property owners. In order to fully understand the experience of lesbians, women of color must be included.

Criticisms 
Friction developed between members of the gay liberation and lesbian feminist movement due to the emphasis on sexual orientation politics through the lens of gender politics alone. Gay liberationists argued that the complexity of sexual orientation politics cannot be easily reduced to gender politics, and that women are denied rights while gay and lesbian individuals are denied existence.

The theory of compulsory heterosexuality is criticized for upholding the existence of a binary gendered system and strict roles under this binary system. This criticism states that compulsory heterosexuality ignores individuals who act outside of their prescribed gender roles as well as ignoring individual agency in life.

Institutions such as Human Rights Campaign and Lambda Legal believe that compulsory heterosexuality is upheld by individuals and organizations, not society-wide beliefs. Therefore, as lesbian and gay visibility increase, compulsory heterosexuality decreases. As individual freedoms for sexual minorities increase, the institution of heterosexuality disappears.

Influence 
Rich believes that a woman is able to overcome compulsory heterosexuality by separating herself from men and entering a lesbian relationship to determine if heterosexuality is right for her. She argued that all women can be lesbians, regardless of sexual orientation, by identifying as a "woman-identified woman", meaning that the woman's focuses are on the needs and emotions of other women. The concept of compulsory heterosexuality and being able to reject this notion became a core component of the lesbian separatist movement that began in the 1970s and continued into the 1980s.

Compulsory heterosexuality is also seen as a precursor to the development of the theory of heteronormativity, with the difference being that compulsory heterosexuality emphasizes the regulation of sexual expression in individuals. The concept has also been used within asexual studies to develop the theory of compulsory sexuality which argues that in addition to being subjected to the pressures of heterosexual conformity in a heteronormative society, individuals also face the assumption that everyone necessarily experiences sexual attraction unless they are "sick, dead, or lying", leading to the erasure of asexual identities.

See also
Biphobia
Bisexual erasure
Heteronormativity
Heterosexism
Heterosociality
Liberal homophobia
Monosexism

References

External links
Compulsory Heterosexuality and Lesbian Existence, by Adrienne Rich

Feminism and sexual orientation
Feminism and sexuality
Feminist terminology
Feminist theory
Heterosexuality
Lesbian feminism
LGBT terminology
Political lesbianism
Queer theory
Radical feminism
LGBT and society